In enzymology, a galactogen 6beta-galactosyltransferase is an enzyme that catalyzes the chemical reaction

UDP-galactose + galactogen  UDP + 1,6-beta-D-galactosylgalactogen

Thus, the two substrates of this enzyme are UDP-galactose and galactogen, whereas its two products are UDP and 1,6-beta-D-galactosylgalactogen.

This enzyme belongs to the family of glycosyltransferases, specifically the hexosyltransferases.  The systematic name of this enzyme class is UDP-galactose:galactogen beta-1,6-D-galactosyltransferase. Other names in common use include uridine diphosphogalactose-galactogen galactosyltransferase, 1,6-D-galactosyltransferase, and beta-(1-6)-D-galactosyltransferase.

References

 

EC 2.4.1
Enzymes of unknown structure